The 1978–79 Biathlon World Cup was a multi-race tournament over a season of biathlon, organised by the UIPMB (Union Internationale de Pentathlon Moderne et Biathlon). The season started on 10 January 1979 in Jáchymov, Czechoslovakia, and ended on 8 April 1979 in Bardufoss, Norway. It was the second season of the Biathlon World Cup, and it was only held for men.

Calendar
Below is the World Cup calendar for the 1978–79 season.

*The relays were technically unofficial races as they did not count towards anything in the World Cup.

World Cup Podium

Men

Standings: Men

Overall 

Final standings after 10 races.

Achievements
First World Cup career victory
, 26, in his 2nd season — the WC 1 Individual in Jáchymov; it also was his first podium
, 24, in his 2nd season — the WC 1 Sprint in Jáchymov; it also was his first podium and the first podium for an Austrian biathlete
, 32, in his 2nd season — the WC 2 Sprint in Antholz-Anterselva; first podium was 1977–78 Sprint in Sodankylä
, 27, in his 2nd season — the WC 3 Individual in Sodankylä; first podium was 1977–78 Individual in Murmansk

First World Cup podium
, 22, in his 2nd season — no. 3 in the WC 1 Individual in Jáchymov
, 27, in his 2nd season — no. 3 in the World Championships Sprint in Ruhpolding; it also was the first podium for an Italian biathlete
, 21, in his 1st season — no. 3 in the WC 3 Individual in Sodankylä
, 21, in his 1st season — no. 3 in the WC 4 Individual in Bardufoss

Victory in this World Cup (all-time number of victories in parentheses)
, 2 (5) first places
, 2 (2) first places
, 1 (4) first place
, 1 (2) first place
, 1 (2) first place
, 1 (1) first place
, 1 (1) first place
, 1 (1) first place

Notes 

1.  In the individual races in Jáchymov some non-World Cup racers participated. In the 20 km individual Jürgen Grundler, Thomas Klinger and Wolfgang Schütze, among others, were non-World Cup racers, and so for World Cup purposes Roar Nilsen won the race, with Rösch and Krokstad coming 2nd and 3rd. Pavlíček, Hess, Avdejev, Engen, Tor Svendsberget, Mathias Jung and Heinz Böttcher came 4th, 5th, 6th, 7th, 8th, 9th and 10th respectively and received the appropriate World Cup points. In the 10 km sprint, some of the non-World Cup racers were Sigvart Bjøntegaard, Stig Kvistad and Gerold Eichhorn, and so they did not receive any World Cup points, and for World Cup purposes Terje Krokstad came 3rd in that race and received the appropriate World Cup points, with Rösch, Hess, Grundler and Mitev coming 4th, 5th, 6th and 7th, respectively, and receiving the appropriate World Cup points.

Retirements
Following notable biathletes retired after the 1978–79 season:

References

Biathlon World Cup
World Cup